Balaram Stack is a professional surfer. He was born on September 5, 1991. The youngest of three surfing brothers, Stack was born in Sebastian, Florida, where he began riding waves on a boogie board at three. His family relocated to Long Island when he was five, settling a half-block from the beach in Point Lookout.

In 2004, Quiksilver, the surf industry's top brand, discovered Stack at a surfing camp in Montauk and added him to its team. In 2009, Stack opted for an independent study course load so that he could travel the world and surf. He spent a month on the North Shore of Oahu, surfing the Banzai Pipeline. He went to Tahiti with Clay Marzo, considered the sport's most creative aerialist. In February, Quiksilver sent him to Australia to train with the surf coach Mick Cain, who used video analysis and mental techniques to improve Stack's contest readiness. In April, at the national scholastic East Coast regional championships in Florida, Stack qualified for the finals in four divisions, winning the Air Show and Explorer Juniors divisions. Stack earned three perfect 10 scores during the tournament, an unprecedented performance for a surfer from the Northeast.

Stack won the wildcard and competed in the ASP 2011 Quiksilver Pro New York in September against the world's best. His short documentary "Stacked" premiered in Long Beach, NY on August 30, 2012. 

Stack's considered one of the world's top free surfers of his generation. Splitting his time between his home in New York and winters on the North Shore of Oahu, Hawaii. When in Hawaii, Balaram is often found at the famed Banzai Pipeline break. 

In 2022, Stack and filmer Ben Gulliver  released Hail Mary, a three-year docu-biopic film project on Stack featuring his mother, Mary Stack. In the film, Stack credits his mother for being the guiding force behind his life and providing him the opportunity to pursue surfing from his early days all the way through his competitive achievements. Stack also pays homage to his home of New York, and his surfing community. 
As of December 2022, Hail Mary has won Best Soundtrack at the 2022 Florida Surf Film Festival, and Best Film and Soundtrack in the 2022 London Surf Film Festival.

At the age of 31, Stack is the first New Yorker to compete in the Pipe Masters (Vans Pipe Masters 2022). One of the most prestigious events in professional surfing at the acclaimed Banzai Pipeline, North Shore, Oahu, Hawai'i. He is also the first New Yorker to make a Pipe Masters Final, and the first New Yorker to ever win a Pipe Masters contest (Vans Pipe Masters 2022).

Education
Balaram graduated from Long Beach High School in 2010.

Profession
He currently is sponsored by Volcom, Electric Eyewar, Chilli Surfboards, Unsound Surf Shop, and Rockstar Energy Drink. He regularly participates in surfing competitions.

References

External links
https://www.volcom.com/blogs/ambassadors/balaram-stack
https://stabmag.com/news/a-new-yorker-is-leading-the-vans-pipe-masters/
http://www.nytimes.com/2009/06/26/sports/26surfing.html?ref=sports
https://archive.nytimes.com/www.nytimes.com/interactive/2011/09/04/sports/04surfbios-1.html
http://nymag.com/news/features/35812/
http://surf.transworld.net/1000114571/news/balaram-stack-wins-unsound-pro/
Surf Camp Help

American surfers
Living people
1991 births
People from Sebastian, Florida
People from Point Lookout, New York
Long Beach High School (New York) alumni